Charles Ashley Teape (16 February 1844 – 1 August 1925) was an English first-class cricketer active 1863–72 who played for Middlesex. He was born in Blackheath, Kent; died in Chelsea. His brother, Arthur, also played first-class cricket.

References

1844 births
1925 deaths
English cricketers
Middlesex cricketers
People from Blackheath, London